"Kick Back" is a song by Japanese musician Kenshi Yonezu. It was released as a single digitally by SME Records on October 12, 2022, as well as in three physical editions: a regular CD edition, a video edition, and a chainsaw edition. The song serves as the opening theme for the anime series Chainsaw Man.

Background and release
This song is used as one of the opening theme for the anime series Chainsaw Man. Yonezu was in charge of the theme song for the TV anime My Hero Academia, the first opening of the second season. It has been about five years since the theme "".

King Gnu and Millennium Parade member Daiki Tsuneta participated in the production and arrangement with Yonezu. "Kick Back" also samples Morning Musume's 2002 song "Sōda! We're Alive".

On September 19, 2022, the preview for Chainsaw Man was released, with "Kick Back" being used. In addition, it was also performed live for the first time at the Tokyo Metropolitan Gymnasium performance on the first day of "2022 Tour / Henshin", which was held on September 23. In addition, the arranger Daiki Tsuneta appeared at the tour final at Saitama Super Arena on October 27, performing this song and "Ai Lily".

The CD single was released in three formats: a chainsaw board, a video board, and a regular board, and it also came with a "Kenshi Yonezu 2023 Tour / Fantasy" advance lottery application serial number and a corporate privilege sticker.

Composition

"Kick Back" is composed in Bb minor in the intro and first half of each verse but it alters to D minor and G minor. Ab minor for the pre-chorus before changing to C# minor during the chorus. After the chorus, it changes back to Bb minor and D minor until it changes to Ab major for the bridge. It then switches to C# minor at the end of the bridge and for the second chorus. The song ends in Bb minor. It is set in a common time of 102 BPM and runs for 3 minutes and 13 seconds.

Music video
Prior to the song's release, the music video premiered on October 25, featuring Yonezu and Daiki Tsuneta. In the video, Yonezu devotes himself to training in a gym alongside Tsuneta. After a montage of vigorous working out and Yonezu shown with large muscular arms, Yonezu runs off a treadmill into a field and then onto a road, where he is hit by a truck, which launches him through the air and into doing parkour across shipping containers and city buildings. A group of men dressed in similar attire appear and run alongside him through an industrial site and across a quarry. The video ends with Yonezu shown back in the gym, walking on a treadmill alongside Tsuneta, with a security camera revealing Tsuneta is not really there.

The opening sequence for the Chainsaw Man anime plays tribute to several films, including Reservoir Dogs, The Texas Chain Saw Massacre, Pulp Fiction, Sadako vs. Kayako, No Country for Old Men, Fight Club, Messiah of Evil, Once Upon a Time in Hollywood, Don't Look Up, Jacob's Ladder, Constantine, and The Big Lebowski. The other references are the manga Goodbye, Eri and Fire Punch by the same author, the song "Sōda! We're Alive" by Morning Musume and the anime Neon Genesis Evangelion. The sequence was directed and storyboarded by Shingo Yamashita.

Track listing

Charts

Weekly charts

Monthly charts

Year-end charts

Certifications

Release history

References

2022 songs
2022 singles
Animated series theme songs
Anime songs
Billboard Japan Hot 100 number-one singles
Chainsaw Man
Kenshi Yonezu songs
Oricon Weekly number-one singles
SME Records singles